On 27 May 2020, the bodies of two Dalit men were found in the Bheri River, a major tributary of the Karnali River. The two men were identified as 21-year-old Nawaraj BK and Tikaram Sunar. According to the Nepal police, when BK and 18 others went to Soti village in Chaurjahari, the villagers allegedly attacked the group and chased them to the river and killed them . Later two additional bodies were found, those of Ganesh Budha and Lokendra Sunar.

Incident 
Nawaraj BK, from the Jajarkot District, went to the Soti village in Rukum District to marry a 17-year-old girl, with her consent. BK went to the village with 18 others on Saturday, 23 May 2020. Upon arriving in the village, they were allegedly attacked and chased by villagers, including Dambar Bahadur Malla, ward chair of Chaurjahari, and the girl's family. The group chased them to the Bheri River and six men jumped into the river to save themselves. According to some villagers, the group was attacked because of their caste; BK was a "lower caste" man trying to marry an "upper caste" girl. Also, the girl's family claims that BK was trying to marry the under-aged girl despite their refusal. BK had been in a relationship with the girl for three years, and wanted to marry her.

On 27 May, the bodies of Nawaraj BK and Tikaram Sunar were found in the Bheri River. Two other bodies, those of Ganesh Budha and Lokendra Sunar, were found later. Two others, Govinda Shahi and Sanju BK, are still missing.

Reaction 
Nepal police arrested Dambar Bahadur Malla, ward chair of Chaurjahari, and fifteen others. The United Nations Mission in Nepal called for an unbiased examination of the incident. The National Human Rights Commission issued a press release writing "Soti incident goes against the provision of the right to live with dignity, right to equality as guaranteed by the constitution of Nepal, Caste-based Discrimination and Untouchability (Crime and Punishment) Act, and International Convention on the Elimination of All Forms of Racial Discrimination, 1965 signed by Nepal". The government of Nepal sent five people to investigate within two weeks.

References 

2020 in Nepal
Caste-related violence in Nepal